Park Tae-kyong (born 30 July 1980) is a male hurdler from South Korea. His personal best time is 13.48 seconds, achieved at the 2010 Asian Games in Guangzhou. This was the South Korean record until 2014

Competition record

References

1980 births
Living people
South Korean male hurdlers
Athletes (track and field) at the 2004 Summer Olympics
Olympic athletes of South Korea
Asian Games medalists in athletics (track and field)
Athletes (track and field) at the 2002 Asian Games
Athletes (track and field) at the 2006 Asian Games
Athletes (track and field) at the 2010 Asian Games
Athletes (track and field) at the 2014 Asian Games
Universiade medalists in athletics (track and field)
Asian Games bronze medalists for South Korea
Medalists at the 2002 Asian Games
Medalists at the 2010 Asian Games
Universiade bronze medalists for South Korea
Medalists at the 2003 Summer Universiade
21st-century South Korean people